Neobuthus factorio is a species of scorpion from the family Buthidae found in Somalia.

Taxonomy 
Specimens of N. factorio may have been collected and temporarily categorized as Neobuthus ferrugineus since 2012. They were defined as a separate species once a larger number of samples could be collected between 2016–2018. The species was named after Factorio, a video game created by the son of one of the researchers who described the species.

Description
The males are much smaller in size, having an average of 17–19 mm in length, while females have 24–27 mm. The pedipalps are relatively slender, with a matte, finely granulated texture in males, and smooth and glossy on females. The body's base colour is of a pale yellow, with dark patterns in the metasoma, pedipalps and legs.

Distribution
N. factorio can be found in Somalia, on rocky areas of semi-desert, occasionally near river beds. The localities of Neobuthus factorio are near to the localities of Neobuthus berberensis.

References 

Endemic fauna of Somalia
Buthidae
Scorpions of Africa
Animals described in 2018